The 2009 Malaysian Grand Prix (formally the 2009 Formula 1 Petronas Malaysian Grand Prix) was a Formula One motor race held on 5 April 2009 at the Sepang International Circuit in Sepang, Malaysia. It was the second race of the 2009 FIA Formula One World Championship. The race was due to be contested over 56 laps, but was stopped after 31 laps due to torrential rain. Jenson Button, driving for the Brawn GP team, was declared the winner, having started from pole position. Nick Heidfeld was classified second for BMW Sauber with Timo Glock third for Toyota.

As the race did not reach the required 75% distance (42 laps) for full points to be awarded, half-points were given instead, for only the fifth time in Formula One history and the first since the 1991 Australian Grand Prix and the last for 12 years until the 2021 Belgian Grand Prix.

Report

Background 

After winning the season-opening Australian Grand Prix held one week earlier, Jenson Button led the Drivers' Championship by two points from his teammate Rubens Barrichello and by four points from Jarno Trulli. Trulli's teammate Timo Glock was fourth and Fernando Alonso completed the top five. Brawn GP led the Constructors' Championship by 7 points from Toyota and by 14 points from Renault. Williams and Toro Rosso were fourth and fifth.

The race start time was moved forward two hours, from 17:00 local time (09:00 UTC) to 15:00 local time (07:00 UTC). However, the organisers turned down the possibility of holding a night race, in line with the 2008 Singapore Grand Prix, for budgetary reasons.

Practice and qualifying 

Three practice sessions were held before the race; the first was held on Friday morning and the second on Friday afternoon. Both sessions lasted 1 hour and 30 minutes with weather conditions dry throughout. The third session was held on Saturday morning and lasted an hour, and was also dry throughout.
Nico Rosberg and Kazuki Nakajima secured a Williams one-two in the first session with times of 1:36.260 and 1:36.305 minutes respectively. In the second session, Ferrari's Kimi Räikkönen and Felipe Massa went quickest with times of 1:35.707 and 1:35.832 minutes. After 18 laps, Räikkönen's cockpit began to billow out smoke, and though Ferrari did not give an official statement, there are reports that the car's kinetic energy recovery system (KERS) had overheated.

Jenson Button took Brawn's second consecutive pole ahead of Jarno Trulli's Toyota. Rubens Barrichello qualified fourth in the other Brawn (third when Vettel's penalty was taken into consideration), but was demoted five places to eighth after a gearbox change. An error in strategy meant that Massa failed to make it through Q1. In an interview to Rede Globo, the driver said that he and the team thought the initial time posted was enough to qualify for the second session, and refrained from recording additional times to spare the car's engine. However, this was not the case, and Massa was left in 16th place.

Race 

Off the line, there was a clean getaway by all drivers, apart from Robert Kubica, who was forced to retire from engine problems after the first lap. Williams' Nico Rosberg moved from fourth on the grid to lead into the first corner, followed by Jarno Trulli and Fernando Alonso, who had used his KERS system to good effect to move up from tenth; Jenson Button made a poor start in his Brawn and was down to fourth. Heading into turn five, McLaren's Heikki Kovalainen ran wide onto the track's 'marbles' (fragments of degraded tyre rubber), and spun into early retirement.

After a slow start, Button caught and passed the heavier Renault of Alonso at turn thirteen for third place and set off after Trulli. Rosberg and Trulli stopped for fuel earlier than Button, who was able to pass them during the first round of pit stops and take the lead. Evidence of rain was barely noticed, but Kimi Räikkönen pitted to switch from dry to full wet tyres. However, his gamble did not pay off, as rain did not come as early as predicted, and he was forced to slow down significantly to delay the rapid wear of the wet tyres. (Without standing water on the track, wet tyres will not maintain structural integrity at high speeds, and will rapidly degrade over the course of a few laps.)

By lap 19, rain had started to fall and most of the drivers pitted for wet tyres. However, at this stage there was no standing water on the track, and so the wet tyres started to wear out very quickly. Timo Glock had been using intermediate tyres which were better suited to the conditions and moved rapidly up to third place. The other drivers followed this example and switched to intermediate tyres as well, which the majority of the field stayed on until lap 31 when the downpour finally reached the whole track, and drivers pitted for wet tyres once again. 
The conditions were proven to be so treacherous that Sebastien Buemi and Sebastian Vettel (who was in 8th position) had both spun out into retirement by lap 31 despite them being on the wet tyres right before the race was stopped.

Due to the torrential rain, the race was stopped on the 33rd lap and the results were taken from the classification at the end of lap 31 (the penultimate fully completed in accordance with sporting regulation 42.8). Half-points were subsequently awarded to the top eight. The race was the fifth out of six races in Formula One to be abandoned before 75% distance: the others were the 1975 Spanish and Austrian Grands Prix, the 1984 Monaco Grand Prix, the 1991 Australian Grand Prix and the 2021 Belgian Grand Prix. Button took his second victory of the season and five points, and it was the first time he had won back to back victories and his third career victory. The victory also meant that Brawn GP became the first team since Alfa Romeo in 1950 to win their first two Grands Prix. Nick Heidfeld was classified second ahead of Toyota's Timo Glock. Heidfeld was the first driver to take a podium position with a KERS-equipped car.

Post-race 

The drivers generally backed the decision to abandon the race, citing diminishing visibility (due to the later starting time) as well as the heavy rain. 

Officials in Malaysia also confirmed that they would review the start time of the  Malaysian Grand Prix. Mokhzani Mahathir, chairman of the Sepang International Circuit, said he consulted Bernie Ecclestone after the race and they had agreed to look at the timings. However, Ecclestone revealed he had no qualms about the schedule, stating:

Mokhzani suggested the possibility of implementing a lighting system (similar to that used in the Singapore Grand Prix) to illuminate the circuit in future races.

Classification 
Cars that used the KERS system are marked with "‡"

Qualifying 

Sebastian Vettel received a 10-place grid penalty for causing an avoidable accident involving Robert Kubica at the Australian Grand Prix.
Rubens Barrichello received a 5-place grid penalty for a gearbox change.

Race

 Scheduled for 56 laps but stopped early due to heavy rain and then not resumed due to darkness. Half points awarded.

Championship standings after the race 

Drivers' Championship standings

Constructors' Championship standings

See also 
 2009 Malaysian GP2 Asia Series round

References

External links 

Official Malaysian Grand Prix results from
FIA
Formula1.com (archived)

Malaysian Grand Prix
Malaysia
Grand Prix
Malaysian Grand Prix